Jean-Baptiste Tribout, or J.B. Tribout (born 14 December 1961) is a French rock climber and sport climber.

Climbing history
Tribout started climbing aged seven in Fontainebleau, France with his grandfather, a mountaineer, and also joined the youth section of the French Alpine Club. There he met other young climbers such as Catherine Destivelle. In 1982, he climbed his first 8a, Fritz the Cat, at Saussois and in 1985 climbed his first 8b, Les braves gens, in the Verdon Gorge. 

Between 1986 and 1998, he participated in international sport climbing competitions, finishing third twice and fourth twice in the final standings of the World Cup. In 2008, aged 47, twelve years after he had last climbed an 8c graded climb, he climbed two 8c routes.

Competition Record

World Cup

World Championship

European Championship

Rock Master

Notable Ascents

8c+/5.14c
The Connexion - Orgon - 1994 - First ascent (combination of Macumba Club and The Bronx)
Superplafond - Volx - 1994 - First ascent (combination of the Maginot Line, called by the French Le plafond, and Terminator)
Just do it - Smith Rock - 1992 - First ascent

8c/5.14b
Intime étrangère - Tournoux - August 4, 2008
Guerre d'usure - Claret - 24 February 2008 - aged 47
Macumba Club - Orgon - 1992 - First ascent
Huevos Rancheros - Gache - 1991 - First ascent
Maginot Line - Volx - 1990 - after Ben Moon in 1989

8b+/5.14a
Les intermutants du spectacle - St Leger - May 16, 2009
Deux cones - Orgon - August 9, 2008
Rollito Sharma - Santa Linya - April 19, 2008
Draconian Devil - Kalymnos - 2006
I am a bad man - Smith Rock - 1991
Cannibal' - American Forks - 1990Cry Freedom - Malham Cove - 1989 - Second ascentMagie Noire - Traverses - 1989Masse Critique - Cimaï - 1989 - First ascentRevanche - Saussois - 1988 - First ascentWhite wedding - Smith Rock - 1988 - First ascentLa rage de vivre - Buoux - 1987 - Second ascentLe Spectre du surmutant - Buoux - 1987 - First ascentLes spécialistes - Verdon Gorge - 1987 - First ascentTo Bolt or not to be'' - Smith Rock - 1986 - First ascent and first 5.14 in the United States

See also
List of grade milestones in rock climbing
History of rock climbing

References

External links
 IFSC Profile
 8a.nu Profile
 Interview on UKClimbing

1961 births
Living people
French rock climbers
Sportspeople from Paris
IFSC Climbing World Cup overall medalists